The Kansas City Journal-Post was a newspaper in Kansas City, Missouri, from 1854 to 1942. It was the oldest newspaper in the city when it went out of business.

It started as a weekly, The Kansas City Enterprise, on September 23, 1854, a year after the city's founding and shortly after The Public Ledger went out of business.  Kansas City's first mayor, William S. Gregory, and future mayors Milton J. Payne and E. Milton McGee, along with city fathers William Gillis, Benoist Troost, Thompson McDaniel, Robert Campbell and Kansas City's first bank and biggest store, Northrup and Chick, pooled $1,000 to start it.

William A. Strong was its first editor, and David K. Abeel the first publisher.  It operated above a tavern at Main Street and the Missouri River in the River Market neighborhood.

In 1855, Strong enlisted another future mayor, Robert T. Van Horn, to take over the paper.  Van Horn bought it for $250 and retained Abeel as publisher.

In 1857 it became The Western Journal of Commerce, and in 1858 it became The Kansas City Daily Western Journal of Commerce.

Before the American Civil War the paper espoused the popular Missouri view that the status quo should be maintained, that Missouri should remain in the Union and remain a slave state.  When the war began, Van Horn enlisted in the Union Army, and the paper became staunchly Republican.

The paper encouraged city officials to persuade the Hannibal and St. Joseph Railroad to build the first bridge across the Missouri River at Kansas City.

In 1880 William Rockhill Nelson started The Kansas City Star, which became The Journal-Post'''s primary competitor.

In 1896 Van Horn sold the paper to Charles S. Gleed and Hal Gaylord, who renamed it The Kansas City Journal.

In 1906 Fuller Brooker founded The Kansas City Post, proclaiming in its first issue:

It will be our purpose in politics to avoid participation in factional disputes and personal quarrels, and seek the general welfare of the Democratic Party as a whole, and that only.

In 1909 Denver Post publisher Frederick Gilmer Bonfils and Harry Tammen bought The Post, with J. Ogden Armour as a silent partner.  The Post, with its tabloid format, red headlines and yellow journalism was linked to the rise of the Tom Pendergast political machine.

In 1921 Walter Dickey bought The Journal. He bought The Post in 1922 and combined their operations at 22nd and Oak.  Dickey invested in the papers so as to compete with The Star, ultimately bankrupting his own lucrative clay-pipe manufacturing company.  The papers combined as The Kansas City Journal-Post on October 4, 1928.

Dickey died in 1931, and his home became the first building at the University of Missouri–Kansas City.

In 1938 with the beginning of the collapse of the Pendergast machine, the paper changed the name of The Post to The Kansas City Journal.  Also in 1938 Journal photographer Jack Wally bylined an undercover photo exposé of gambling houses under Pendergast that ran in Life magazine.

The paper's last publication was on March 31, 1942.  It had been the last daily competition to The Star''.

References

UMKC.edu history of paper. Other sources are given there.

External links
100-Year-Old Weblog of the Kansas City Journal

Mass media in the Kansas City metropolitan area
Defunct newspapers published in Missouri
Newspapers established in 1854
Publications disestablished in 1942
1854 establishments in Missouri
1942 disestablishments in Missouri